Henry Collins may refer to:

Henry Collins (politician) (1844–1904), mayor of Vancouver
Henry Collins (official) (1905–1961), U.S. citizen, government employee and Soviet spy
Henry Collins (boxer) (born 1977), boxer from Australia
 Henry Collins (artist) (1910–1994), artist and designer
Henry B. Collins (1899–1987), Smithsonian Institution anthropologist and archeologist
Henry Powell Collins, British Member of Parliament for Taunton, 1819–1820
Henry Collins (Royal Navy officer), active during the American War of Independence, see Battle of Chestnut Neck
Henry Collins, music producer under the name Shitmat

See also
Harry Collins (disambiguation)